Federico Zenuni (born 19 January 1997) is a professional footballer who plays as a central midfielder. Born in Italy, he represented the country internationally at U15 level before switching to Albania for levels U17, U19 and U21.

Club career

Early career
Zenuni started his youth career at age of 6 with Torino F.C. In 2014 he advanced at the Primavera team and won the 2014–15 Campionato Nazionale Primavera beating Lazio Primavera in the final. He was part of the team also in the next season and participated in the 2015–16 UEFA Youth League Domestic Champions Path.

Torino

Loan to Tuttocuoio
On 25 July 2016, Torino decided to loan Zenuni at Lega Pro side A.C. Tuttocuoio 1957 San Miniato for the 2016–17 season.

He made it his first professional debut at Tuttocuoio on 11 September 2016 against Lupa Roma coming on as a substitute in the 69th minute in place of Marco Berardi.

Loan to Viterbese Castrense
Zenuni was loaned one more time at Serie C moving on 27 July 2017 to A.S. Viterbese Castrense.

Teramo
On 11 July 2018, he moved on a permanent basis to the Serie C club Teramo.

Virtus Francavila
On 14 January 2019, he signed with Virtus Francavilla.

International career

Italy U15
Zenuni was gathered with Italy U15 national team in 2011.

Albania U19
Zenuni was called up to the Albania U19 national team by coach Arjan Bellaj to participate in the 2016 UEFA European Under-19 Championship qualification from 12 to 17 November 2015. He played two full 90-minute matches, in the opening one against Austria U19 which finished as a 2–1 loss and against Georgia U19 two days later which ended 1–0. In the closing game against Wales U19, Zenuni scored twice to send Albania U19 in advantage in both cases and following a goal later by Ardian Krasniqi in the 42nd minute, Albania U19 ended by taking the 3–2 victory.

Albania U21
Zenuni received his first call up at the Albania U21 by coach Skënder Gega to participate in the Antalya Cup developed in Antalya, Turkey against Saudi Arabia U21 on 22 January 2016, Bahrain U21 on 24 January, Azerbaijan U21 on 26 January, Kosovo U21 on 28 January and Ukraine U21 on 30 January.

Zenuni was called up by coach Alban Bushi for the friendly match against France U21 on 5 June 2017 and the 2019 UEFA European Under-21 Championship qualification opening match against Estonia U21 on 12 June 2017. He was not part of the 18-man squad which featured in the opening match of the qualifiers against Estonia U21.

Career statistics

Club

International
. Albania score listed first, score column indicates score after each Zenuni's goal.

References

External links
Federico Zenuni profile at FSHF.org

1997 births
Living people
Footballers from Turin
Albanian footballers
Albania youth international footballers
Albania under-21 international footballers
Italian footballers
Italian people of Albanian descent
Association football midfielders
Serie C players
A.C. Tuttocuoio 1957 San Miniato players
U.S. Viterbese 1908 players
S.S. Teramo Calcio players
Virtus Francavilla Calcio players
Potenza Calcio players
Albanian expatriate footballers
Albanian expatriate sportspeople in Italy
Expatriate footballers in Italy